Amar Hamam Stadium is a football stadium in Khenchela, Algeria. The stadium holds 5,000 people. It serves as a home ground for USM Khenchela which plays in Algerian Ligue Professionnelle 1.

References

Sports venues in Algeria